The list of notable Wharton School alumni are graduates of the Wharton School of the University of Pennsylvania. As of 2018, there are approximately 99,000 alumni in over 150 different countries, including 79,280 in North America, 5,660 in Asia, 4,510 in Europe, 1,370 in the Caribbean and Latin America, 930 in Africa and the Middle East, and 380 in Australia and New Zealand.

Academia
Notable alumni include:
Baidyanath Misra, former vice-chancellor of the Odisha University of Agriculture and Technology; chairman of Odisha State Planning Board; chairman of Odisha's First State Finance Commission
Cleo W. Blackburn, educator
William Frederick Boulding, dean of the Fuqua School of Business at Duke University
Mark Burstein, academic administrator at Lawrence University
Amos Eiran, president of the University of Haifa, Israel
Ramchandran Jaikumar, Daewoo Professor of Business Administration at the Harvard Business School
Steve Salbu, dean emeritus of the Scheller College of Business at the Georgia Institute of Technology, 2006–2014
Louis B. Schwartz, law professor at the University of Pennsylvania Law School
Benn Steil, economist and writer; senior fellow and director of international economics at the Council on Foreign Relations; founder and editor of the journal International Finance)
Nassim Nicholas Taleb, researcher in risk and uncertainty, originator of the Black Swan theory; author of the Incerto.
George Taylor, considered the "father of American arbitration"; Department of Labor Hall of Honor inductee; namesake of the Taylor Law

Business and industry

Laurent Adamowicz, French entrepreneur; lecturer; author; public health advocate
Anil Ambani, chairman of Reliance Group
Ayman Asfari, British-Syrian billionaire; CEO of Petrofac
Beth Axelrod, vice-president of Employee Experience at Airbnb
Victor Barnett, former chairman of Burberry
Baron Norman Blackwell, chairman of Interserve
Mitchell J. Blutt, CEO of Consonance Capital
George Bradt, founder and chairman of PrimeGenesis; CEO of J.D. Power's Power Information Network
Julian A. Brodsky, founder, chairman and CEO of Comcast Corporation 
John Browett, British businessman; former chief executive of the Dunelm Group and Monsoon Accessorize; senior vice-president of retail at Apple Inc.
Rosalind Brewer, COO of Starbucks; former president and CEO of Sam's Club
Charles Butt, chairman and CEO of H-E-B
Robert Castellini, owner of Cincinnati Reds
Bill Conner, CEO of SonicWall
Vikram Chatwal, hotelier
Arthur D. Collins Jr., chairman and CEO of Medtronic 
Anthony Connelly, president and CEO of Disney Cruise Line
Robert Crandall, chairman and CEO of American Airlines 
William J. DeLaney III, CEO of Sysco 
Donny Deutsch, chairman and CEO of Deutsch NY and DHL
Michael DiCandilo, CFO and EVP of AmerisourceBergen
José Aurélio Drummond Jr., Brazilian businessman; CEO of BRF S.A.
Dominique Heriard Dubreuil, CEO of Rémy Cointreau
Mike Eskew, chairman and CEO of UPS 
John L. Flannery, chairman and CEO of General Electric Company
Samuel S. Fleisher, manufacturer, art patron, and philanthropist
Fred Fraenkel vice-chairman of Cowen Group 
Rakesh Gangwal, chairman and CEO of US Airways
Mandy Ginsberg, CEO of Match Group
Robert B. Goergen, founder, chairman and CEO of Blyth
Chip Goodyear, CEO of BHP Billiton 
Alex Gorsky, CEO of Johnson & Johnson 
Leonard I. Green, founding partner of Leonard Green & Partners
Nilesh Gupta, managing director of Lupin Limited
Adam Jay Harrison, defense industry entrepreneur and innovator
Jon Huntsman Sr., founder, chairman and CEO of Huntsman Corporation
Steve Ives, information technology entrepreneur
Waleed Iqbal, Pakistani senator from Punjab; chairperson of the Pakistan Senate Committee for Defense; partner at Lexium Law; law professor
Reginald Jones, former chairman and CEO of General Electric
Jay I. Kislak, philanthropist and businessman.
Anne Sceia Klein, businesswoman and communications specialist
Gerard Kleisterlee, former CEO and president of Philips 
Yotaro Kobayashi, chairman and co-CEO of Fuji Xerox 
Chester Koo, Taiwanese businessman
Leslie Koo, Taiwanese businessman
Anil Kumar (born 1958), management consultant who pled guilty to insider trading
Leonard Lauder, CEO and chairman of Estée Lauder
Hettie Simmons Love, first African-American to earn an MBA from Wharton, in 1947
Jho Low, fugitive sought by authorities in Malaysia, Singapore, and the United States, regarding the 1MDB scandal
Victoria Mars, chairman, Mars, Incorporated
Matthew Mellon of businessman, former chairman of the New York Republican State Committee’s finance committee
 Gayle Laakmann McDowell founder; coder; speaker; author of Cracking the Coding Interview
Alan Miller, founder and CEO of Universal Health Services 
Aditya Mittal, president and CFO of Mittal Steel Company
Christian Ngan, Cameroonian businessman, entrepreneur and owner of Adlyn Holdings and the Madlyn Cazalis Group
Phebe Novakovic, chairman and CEO of General Dynamics 
Manuel Pangilinan, chairman and CEO of First Pacific
Nelson Peltz, CEO of Triarc Companies (Snapple, Arby's, TJ Cinnamon and Pasta Connection)
Jay Penske, board of directors of the Entrepreneurial School at the Wharton School
Jeffrey E. Perelman, businessman; philanthropist; founder, chairman and CEO of JEP Management 
Raymond G. Perelman, businessman; philanthropist; founder, chairman and CEO of RGP Holdings
Ronald O. Perelman, chairman and CEO of MacAndrews & Forbes Group
Sundar Pichai, CEO of Google
Sachin Pilot, politician
Lewis E. Platt, chairman and CEO of Boeing 
J.D. Power III, founder of marketing research firm J.D. Power and Associates 
Edmund T. Pratt Jr., CEO and chairman emeritus, Pfizer 
Sashi Reddi, entrepreneur; venture capitalist; technologist; philanthropist
Brian L. Roberts, chairman and CEO of Comcast Corporation
Tracy A. Robinson, CEO of Canadian National Railway
John Sculley, CEO of Pepsi
Joseph Segel, founder of over 20 companies, most notably QVC and Franklin Mint
Toots Shor, New York City restaurateur
Ashmeet Sidana, entrepreneur; venture capitalist
Peter A. Smith, British businessman; director of Rothschild & Co; former chairman of Savills
Brian Stafford, CEO of Diligent Corporation
Herbert D. Strauss, CEO and chairman of Grey Advertising Agency
Anderson Tanoto, director of Royal Golden Eagle (RGE) manufacturing conglomerate; philanthropist
Nicholas F. Taubman, CEO and chairman of Advance Auto Parts
James S. Tisch, CEO of Loews Corporation 
Jacob Wallenberg, banker, industrialist of the Swedish Wallenberg family
Nancy Wang, businesswoman; founder of Advancing Women in Product philanthropist 
Stuart Weitzman, founder and CEO of Stuart Weitzman
Gary L. Wilson, chairman and CEO of Northwest Airlines
William Wrigley Jr., founder and CEO of Wrigley Company 
Art Wrubel, private equity investor; founder of Wesley Capital Management; minority owner of the Philadelphia 76ers
Klaus Zumwinkel, former chairman and CEO of Deutsche Post
Raghu Raghuram, CEO, VMware

Finance

Zeti Akhtar Aziz, governor of Bank Negara Malaysia, the Central Bank of Malaysia
Tom Bayer, member of the board of directors of the Reserve Bank of Vanuatu
Lauren Bessette, banker, sister of Carolyn Bessette-Kennedy
Alfred Berkeley, former president and vice-chairman of the NASDAQ Stock Market, Inc.
Richard A. Bloch, founder and CEO of H&R Block 
Mitchell J. Blutt, founder and chairman of Consonance Capital
Boediono, governor of Bank Indonesia, the Central Bank of Indonesia
Warren Buffett, CEO of Berkshire Hathaway
Steven A. Cohen, founder of SAC Capital Advisors 
Pridiyathorn Devakula, governor of the Central Bank of Thailand
Jamie Dinan, investor and founder of York Capital Management
William P. Egan, founding partner of Alta Communications, founding partner of Marion Equity Partners
Catherine Austin Fitts, managing member, Solari Advisors
Dawn Fitzpatrick, global head of Equities, Multi-Asset for O'Connor at UBS Asset Management
Bradley Fried, British economist and writer 
Marcos Galperin, founder and CEO of Mercado Libre
Ashish Goyal, first visually impaired trader in the world
C. Robert Henrikson, chairman, president and CEO of MetLife
Vernon Hill, founder, chairman and CEO of Commerce Bank 
Henry Jackson, founder and CEO of Merchant Equity Partners
Charlie Javice, founder and CEO of Frank
Robert S. Kapito, founder and president of BlackRock (world's largest asset manager)
Vivek Kulkarni, founder and MD of Brickwork Ratings
Vikram Limaye, Managing Director and CEO of the National Stock Exchange of India Limited 
Jeffrey Alfred Legum, president and CEO of The Park Circle Motor Company
Alexander Lloyd, venture capitalist
Adriano B. Lucatelli, Swiss manager and businessperson
Peter Lynch, former Fidelity Investments Magellan Fund manager; chairman of the Lynch Foundation; author
William E. Macaulay, CEO and chairman of First Reserve Corporation 
Howard Marks, founder of Oaktree Capital 
Michael Milken, inventor of the high-yield bond market; convicted of securities reporting violations and permanently barred from the securities industry
Yuri Milner, founder of DST Global and Breakthrough Prize Foundation
Ken Moelis, founder of Moelis & Company 
Michael Moritz, Sequoia Capital
John Neff, chairman of Wellington Management
Daniel Och, founder of Och-Ziff Capital Management
Stephen M. Peck, philanthropist and co-founder of Weiss, Peck & Greer
Douglas L. Peterson, CEO of S&P Global
Ruth Porat, CFO of Alphabet, Inc./Google, Inc.; former CFO of Morgan Stanley
Frank Quattrone, founder of the Technology Groups at Morgan Stanley, Deutsche Bank and Credit Suisse; founder of Qatalyst Partners
Raj Rajaratnam, hedge fund CEO of Galleon Group; convicted of insider trading
Larry Robbins, founder of Glenview Capital Management
Eileen Clarkin Rominger, CIO of Goldman Sachs Asset Management
Barry Rosenstein, hedge fund manager
Jacqui Safra, Swiss investor, owner of Encyclopædia Britannica and Merriam-Webster
Durreen Shahnaz, founder of Impact Investment Exchange (IIX)
Michael Steinhardt, founder of Steinhardt, Fine, Berkowitz and Company
Paul Wachter, businessman and investment advisor
Jacob Wallenberg, chairman of Investor AB
Dawne Williams, former CEO of  St. Kitts-Nevis-Anguilla National Bank
Alan Wilzig, entrepreneur and investor
Robert Wolf, president and CEO of UBS Investment Bank Americas
Peter Wuffli, former CEO of UBS AG 
Martin Zweig, investment advisor, author of Winning on Wall Street

Journalism 
William A. Reuben, investigative journalist
 David Vise, Pulitzer Prize winner, Washington Post

Law 
Herbert B. Cohen, judge
David N. Feldman, attorney
Herbert B. Newberg, class action attorney
Maxwell E. Seidman, lawyer and Democratic politician
Ronald M. Gould, Judge for the United States Circuit Court of Appeals for the 9th Circuit

Media

Walter Annenberg, publisher; founder and CEO of Triangle Publications
Jim Bankoff, chairman and chief executive officer of Vox Media
Anthony Connelly, president and CEO of Disney Cruise Line
Donny Deutsch, chairman of Deutsch, Inc.; host of CNBC's The Big Idea with Donny Deutsch
Wendy Finerman, Oscar-winning film producer (Forrest Gump, 1994)
Lindsay Gardner, media executive; Layer3 TV chief content officer; Democratic Party strategist and fundraiser
Aaron Karo, author; comedian
Laura Lang, former CEO of Time, Inc.
Gerald Lestz (1935), columnist ;author; publisher; founder of the Demuth Museum
Warren Lieberfarb, CEO and president of Warner Home Video
Jay Livingston, Oscar-winning composer (The Paleface, 1948; Captain Carey, 1950; and The Man Who Knew Too Much, 1956)
John D. MacDonald, author
Harold W. McGraw III, chairman and CEO of McGraw-Hill
William S. Paley, founder of Columbia Broadcasting System (CBS)
Manuel V. Pangilinan, president and CEO of Philippine Telephone Company
Robert B. Sinclair, film and theater director
Gregg Spiridellis, founder of JibJab Media
Ty Stiklorius: Emmy Award-winning film and television producer, music executive, and philanthropist
Kidlat Tahimik (Eric De Guia), Filipino filmmaker,;National Artist of the Philippines
Laurence Tisch, former CEO of CBS
Cenk Uygur, radio talk show host (The Young Turks and Air America Radio); The Huffington Post columnist
Eric Weinberg, television screenwriter and producer
Rick Yune, actor; screenwriter; producer; martial artist
Mortimer Zuckerman, chairman and editor-in-chief of U.S. News & World Report

Military 

 Roni Alsheikh, Israeli intelligence officer and head of the Israel Police

Music

Hoodie Allen, aka Steven Markowitz, hip-hop artist and rapper
Moe Jaffe, songwriter and bandleader

Politics and nonprofit 

Susan Abrams, CEO of the Illinois Holocaust Museum and Education Center
Armand Arreza, former administrator and CEO of the Subic Bay Metropolitan Authority
Robert B. Asher, politician and businessman. Co-chairman of the board of directors of Asher's Chocolates in Pennsylvania and Pennsylvania's committeeman on the Republican National Committee
Ernesto Pérez Balladares, president of Panama (1994-1999)
David Campbell Bannerman, Conservative Member of the European Parliament for the East of England
Louis A. Bloom, Pennsylvania State Representative for Delaware County (1947–1952), Judge Pennsylvania Court of Common Pleas for Delaware County
Boediono, vice president (2009–2014), Minister for the Economy (2005–2009), Minister of Finance (2001–2005), Indonesia
Andrew M. Bradley, Pennsylvania Secretary of Property and Supplies (1957–1960)
William Brennan, associate justice, US Supreme Court (1956-1990)
Bob Brooks, member of the Pennsylvania House of Representatives (2018-)
Andy Carter, British Conservative Member of Parliament for Warrington South.
Patrick Chovanec, business professor at Tsinghua University
Bill Cobey, former U.S. representative from North Carolina's 4th congressional district (1985-1987); director of the Jesse Helms Center
Zehnder Confair, Pennsylvania State Senator
James DePreist, director and conductor, Oregon Symphony
Ron Dermer, Israeli ambassador to the United States (2013-2021)
Moonis Elahi, Pakistani businessman and politician
Jonathan Fielding, former chairman of Truth Campaign, director of Public Health for Los Angeles County, Philanthropist, professor, UCLA School of Public Health
Edwin Feulner, president of American Heritage Foundation
Gary Gensler, chair of Securities and Exchange Commission; former chairman of the US Commodity Futures Trading Commission
Sila María González Calderón, Puerto Rican senator (2005-2013); former First Lady (2001-2005)
Kate Gallego, mayor of Phoenix (2019-)
Gary L. Gottlieb, M.D., M.B.A., former president and CEO of Partners HealthCare
Isabella Casillas Guzman, Director of the Small Business Administration
John J. Hafer, former Maryland state senator (1991-2007)
Alfred Irving Hallowell, president of the American Anthropological Association
Patrick T. Harker, President of the Federal Reserve Bank of Philadelphia (2015-); former dean of the Wharton School (1999-2007)
Ron Huldai, Mayor of Tel Aviv (1998-)
Ahsan Iqbal, Pakistani Minister for Interior (2017-2018)
Paul Judge, chairman of the British Royal Society of Arts, founder of the Judge Business School at Cambridge University
Neel Kashkari, President of the Federal Reserve Bank of Minneapolis (2016-); 
Ashwini Vaishnaw, Indian Politician and Current Minister of Railways and Minister of IT and Communications 
Ted Kaufman, U.S. Senator from Delaware (2009-2010)
Matin Ahmed Khan, dean and director, Institute of Business Administration, Karachi, 1972–77
Ann McLaughlin Korologos, Former U.S. Labor Secretary (1987-1989); Former Chair of the Aspen Institute
Frank Lavin, former Under Secretary of Commerce for International Trade; former United States Ambassador to Singapore (2001-2005)
Risa Lavizzo-Mourey, President and CEO of Robert Wood Johnson Foundation (2003-2017)
Lawrence Lessig, founder and director of Harvard Berkman Center for Internet & Society
Peter Lorange, president of IMD (Switzerland)
Reggie Love, former body man for President Barack Obama
Cardozo M. Luna, Undersecretary of Department of National Defense (2016-); former Philippine Ambassador to the Netherlands(2009-2010); former vice chief of staff and lieutenant general of the Armed Forces of the Philippines
Mauricio Macri, former mayor of Buenos Aires City and president of Argentina
Bongbong Marcos (did not graduate), President of the Philippines
Ann Dore McLaughlin, former U.S. Secretary of Labor (1987-1989)
Winnie Monsod, former director-general of National Economic and Development Authority of the Philippines; former member of the UN Committee for Development Planning (UNCDP) from 1987 to 2000; former member of the board of trustees of the International Food Policy Research Institute (IFPRI)
Philip D. Murphy, U.S. Ambassador to Germany (2009-2013); current and 56th governor of New Jersey (2018–present)
John W. Murphy, U.S. Congressman from Pennsylvania (1943-1946)
Michael Nutter, mayor of Philadelphia (2008–2015)
Peter O'Donnell, Texas state Republican chairman (1962-1969); Dallas investor and philanthropist
Alassane Dramane Ouattara, president (2010–present), Ivory Coast; governor of the Central Bank of West African States; Deputy Head of the International Monetary Fund
Corrado Passera, former CEO of Banca Intesa of Italy; Italian Minister of Economic Development, Infrastructure and Transport
Frances Perkins, former U.S. Secretary of Labor (1933-1945), first female U.S. Presidential Cabinet Member, and architect of Social Security system
Douglas Peters, Canadian economist and politician
Sachin Pilot, Indian politician
John Quelch, dean, London Business School
Russell Redenbaugh, member of the United States Civil Rights Commission (1990–2005)
Garrett Reisman, NASA astronaut
Eli Rosenbaum, director of Office of Special Investigations (United States Department of Justice)
Manuel Roxas II, member of the House of Representatives (1993–2000), senator (2004–2010), Secretary of Trade and Industry (2000–2003), Secretary of Transportation and Communications (2011–2012) and Secretary of Interior and Local Government (2012–2015) in the Philippines
Mark Villar, Senator of the Philippines (2022–present), Secretary of Public Works and Highways (2016-2021), member of the House of Representatives from Las Pinas (2010-2016)
Francisco Sagasti, President of Peru (2020-2021)
Andrew Saul, chairman of the Federal Retirement Thrift Investment Board, vice-chairman of the Metropolitan Transportation Authority; investor; former owner/CEO of Brooks Brothers
David Scott, US Congressman from Georgia
Richard Stearns, president of World Vision
Nao Takasugi, California State Assembly and mayor of Oxnard, California
William J. Trent, executive director of the United Negro College Fund (1944–1964)
Donald Trump, 45th President of the United States (2017-2021)
Rexford Tugwell, Governor of Puerto Rico (1941-1946)
Mohammad Uzair, dean and director, Institute of Business Administration, Karachi
Cesar Virata, Prime Minister (1981–1986) and Secretary of Finance (1970–1986) of the Philippines
Charles Wall (c. 1903–1995), resident superintendent of George Washington's estate at Mount Vernon for 39 years, starting in 1937
John H. Ware III (1930), U.S. Congressman for Pennsylvania
Adlai Wertman, professor of clinical management and organization, USC Marshall School of Business
Bob Ziegelbauer, Wisconsin politician

Real estate 
Edward J. Lewis, chairman and CEO of Oxford Development Company
Pete Rummell, former chairman and CEO of Walt Disney Imagineering and St. Joe Company
A.J. Steigman, founder and CEO of Steignet
Jeffrey Sutton, president of Wharton Properties
Donald Trump Jr., executive vice president of the Trump Organization, Son of Donald Trump the 45th President of the United States
Ivanka Trump, executive vice president of the Trump Organization,  Former Director of the Office of Economic Initiatives and Entrepreneurship, Daughter of Donald Trump the 45th President of the United States

Sports 
Douglas Glanville, Major League Baseball player and analyst
Frank Chapot, Olympic equestrian
Paul Friedberg (born 1959), Olympic fencer
Austin Gunsel, football executive and FBI agent
Joshua Harris, principal owner of the New Jersey Devils and the Philadelphia 76ers
Erik Lorig (born 1986), NFL football tight end and fullback
Bruce Manson (born 1956), tennis player
Ugonna Onyekwe, former professional basketball player
Yoav Saffar (born 1975), basketball player
Andrew Towne (born 1982), member of the team that completed the first human-powered transit of the Drake Passage.
Justin Tuck, New York Giants defensive end
Stephanie McCaffrey, former NWSL and USWNT soccer player

Technology

Sam Hamadeh, founder of Vault.com Inc.
Mark D. Kingdon, CEO of Linden Lab, parent company of Second Life
Josh Kopelman, founder of Half.com
Curtis Lee, founder and CEO of Luxe
Joey Levin, CEO of IAC
Marc Lore, founder and CEO of Jet.com, acquired by Walmart for $3.3 billion in August 2016
Elon Musk, co-founder and ex-CEO of PayPal; founder, CEO and CTO of SpaceX, CEO and Product Architect of Tesla Motors Chairman of SolarCity
Ben Nelson, CEO of Snapfish
Peter M. Nicholas, founder, CEO and chairman of Boston Scientific 
Laurene Powell Jobs, founder and chair of Emerson Collective
Sundar Pichai, CEO of Alphabet and Google 
Mark Pincus, founder and CEO of Zynga 
Lewis E. Platt, former chairman and CEO of Hewlett Packard 
Ruth Porat, CFO of Alphabet, parent company of Google
Josh Resnick, founder, CEO and president of Pandemic Studios Inc
John Sculley, former CEO of Apple Inc. 
James L. Vincent, chairman and CEO of Biogen Idec
Jeff Weiner, CEO of LinkedIn
Fred Wilson, managing partner of Union Square Ventures
Selorm Adadevoh - Chief Executive Officer of MTN Ghana, a subsidiary of MTN Group

Writers
Susan Braudy, author and journalist
Nina Godiwalla, author of Suits: A Woman on Wall Street
Jerry Mander, environmentalist and author of Four Arguments for the Elimination of Television
James Martin, Jesuit priest and writer
Clarissa Sligh, photographer and book artist
Barney Berlinger, decathlete and winner of the Sullivan Award
Mark DeRosa, Major League Baseball player for the Washington Nationals
Reem Kassis, author of The Palestinian Table
Matthew E. May, author

Other 

 Nirav Modi, businessman, jewellery designer, diamond merchant and fraudster
 Mehmet Oz, physician, writer, and television personality

See also 
List of companies founded by University of Pennsylvania alumni
List of University of Pennsylvania people

References

 
Wharton